The 19667/19668 Udaipur City - Mysuru Palace Queen Humsafar Express is a Humsafar Express operated by Indian Railways which connected Udaipur city railway station in Rajasthan and Mysuru Junction railway station in Karnataka. It is currently operated with 19667/19668 train numbers on a weekly basis.

Route & Halts

Loco link
Both trains were hauled by WDP4D of Bhagat Ki Kothi BGKT loco shed on their entire journey.

The line was inaugurated on 26 February 2018

Rake Sharing
The train shared its rake with 22985/22986 Udaipur City-Delhi Sarai Rohilla Rajasthan Humsafar Express.

Notes

References 

Humsafar Express trains
Transport in Udaipur
Transport in Mysore
Rail transport in Rajasthan
Rail transport in Karnataka
Rail transport in Madhya Pradesh
Rail transport in Gujarat
Rail transport in Maharashtra
Railway services introduced in 2018